Waada is a 1957 Pakistani musical romance film directed by W.Z. Ahmed. It is the first
film that Ahmed made in the country after he migrated to Pakistan and he made two films in Pakistan.

Sabiha Khanam and Santosh Kumar played the lead roles in the film. The film became a hit due to its music which was composed by Rashid Attre, especially the songs "Jab terey sehar sey guzarta hoon" and "Bar bar barseen morey nain" became widely popular at that time.

Waada was a commercially successful of 1957 and won two awards at Nigar Awards including Best actor for Kumar and best director.

The film was screened at Lok Virsa Museum in 2018. In an article published by BBC, Waada was listed among the 10 best films of Pakistani cinema.

Plot 
Bahadur works as a servant for Akbar Ali Khan. His several encounters with Fareeda make them start liking each other.  They fall in love with each other, and they promise to stay together forever when she comes on a picnic on Akbar's invitation with her father, as her father is a friend of Akbar. At the picnic, Akbar's younger brother Asghar hits Bahadur in jealousy as he wants to marry Fareeda.

Bahadur is taken away by a poor old farmer and his daughter, Farhat. She takes care of him and, he regains consciousness after a month but goes blind. On his demand, Farhat takes him to Fareeda's house where her nikkah with Asgahr is yet to happen but her sister is married to Akbar. Fareeda comes outside after listing Bahadur and they both elope to Farhat's house where they decide to marry and go far away but they get caught by Fareeda's father. He arrests Bahadur and locks him up in jail and also strictly treats Fareeda. She again elopes from her house and goes to Bahadur who is now out of jail. They decide to leave the city, go to another city and a man helps them a lot throughout the journey. He helps them in their living and Bahadur's treatment as well. Later, it is revealed to Fareeda that Asghar hired this man who creates differences between her and Bahadur and both of them part their ways.

Fareeda goes to her house where her father accepts her. Her sister dies after giving birth to a child and on his father's demand, she marries Akbar for the sake of her sister's child.

After many years, Akbar receives a letter from Bahadur where he mentions that he is coming from abroad and has now become a rich person. Unaware of Fareeda's marriage, Bahadur asks Akbar to meet his wife. He calls Fareeda to which there is no response, and they rush towards her room where she is lying dead. Bahadur is shocked to see Fareeda as his wife, who has embraced death because she couldn't fulfill her promise.

Cast 
 Sabiha Khanum
 Santosh Kumar
 Ilyas Kashmiri
 Laila
 Allauddin

Music 
The music of the film was composed by Rashid Attre and the lyrics were written by Tufail Hoshiarpuri and Saifuddin Saif. The songs of the film became very popular especially, "Jab terey shehar sey guzarta hoon" and "Bar bar barseen morey nain".

Track list 
 Jab terey shehar sey guzarta hoon Sung by Sharafat Ali 
 Bar bar barseen morey nain by Kausar Parveen and Sharafat Ali
 Aaj ki raat matt jao, kahin aaj ki raat by Kausra Parveen
 Ab jo milun gi, un say kahun gi, bolo jee by Kausra Parveen
 Jhoom jhoom kar gaye jawani, dil lay lo by Zubaida Khanum
 Lay chal, lay chal, lay chal, ab manjhdar mein by Sharafat Ali and Kausar Parveen
 Nain se nain milaye rakhne ko, mitwa mora chahat ko by Fateh Ali Khan, Zahida Parveen and others
 Nazar nazar say mila lein, agar ijazat ho by Kausar Parveen and Saleem Raza
 Qismat roothi, sathi chhota, reh geya gham by Kausra Parveen and Sharafat Ali
 Shaam saveray nain bichha kar rah takun main sajan ki by Kausar Parveen
 Sunayen kya dukh bhari kahani, sunayen kya dard ka afsana by Kausar Parveen

Awards 
At the 1957 Nigar Awards ceremony, the film received two awards in the following categories:

References 

Pakistani romance films
Pakistani black-and-white films
1950s Urdu-language films
Nigar Award winners
Urdu-language Pakistani films